Hunter Lowden (born April 10, 1982) is a Canadian sailor. He competed at the 2012 Summer Olympics in the 49er class.

References

Canadian male sailors (sport)
Living people
Olympic sailors of Canada
Sailors at the 2012 Summer Olympics – 49er
1982 births